TCDD may refer to any of the following:

 Turkish State Railways (Türkiye Cumhuriyeti Devlet Demiryolları) - The national railway carrier of Turkey.
 TCDD Taşımacılık - A Turkish transport company responsible for railway operations.
 2,3,7,8-Tetrachlorodibenzodioxin — a type of dioxin.
 Texas Council for Developmental Disabilities